Steve Rosolen (born 16 December 1966) is an Australian former professional rugby league footballer who played as a  forward for Brisbane Norths in the Brisbane Rugby League premiership, as well as the London Crusaders in the second division and their later incarnation as the London Broncos in the European Super League. He also played for the North Sydney Bears in their 1991 Reserve Grade Grand Final.

He first came to England on trial, but broke his arm 50 minutes into his first game for Salford.

For many years his 171 games played for the London club was a record.

References

External links
PLAYER DEVIL NUMBERS
LONDON PLAYERS ROLL OF HONOUR

Living people
Rugby league second-rows
Australian rugby league players
London Broncos players
1966 births